Luigi Mantovani (Milan, 1880 – Milan, 1957) was an Italian painter.

Biography
Encouraged in his artistic studies by his father Giuseppe who was an engraver, he enrolled at the Brera Academy in 1896 and became a pupil of Giuseppe Mentessi, Vespasiano Bignami and Cesare Tallone.

He made his debut at the 4th Esposizione Triennale di Brera in 1900 with two landscape studies and began to participate regularly in the exhibitions held at the Famiglia Artistica Milanese and the Società per le Belle Arti ed Esposizione Permanente, becoming established on the art scene in 1906 through his participation in the Esposizione Internazionale di Milano. From the 1920s on, he distinguished himself as a protagonist in the Milanese cultural coteries, being one of the leading lights of the Associazione degli Acquarellisti Lombardi and of the Famiglia Artistica Milanese, and he was awarded a gold medal at the exhibition devoted to the Lombard landscape in 1926. From the outset his cityscapes and landscapes are characterised by broken brushstrokes and a light, transparent palette, which was to become his signature style. In the 1940s, when he took up painting again after the long hiatus due to World War II, he reprised his repertoire of Milanese and Venetian views, which had now become repetitive and conventional, using a looser and more fluid pictorial technique.

Bibliography
 Elena Lissoni, Luigi Mantovani, online catalogue Artgate by Fondazione Cariplo, 2010, CC BY-SA (source for the first revision of this article).

Other projects

19th-century Italian painters
Italian male painters
Italian vedutisti
Italian landscape painters
Painters from Milan
1880 births
1957 deaths
20th-century Italian painters
19th-century Italian male artists
20th-century Italian male artists